Chile competed at the 2014 Winter Olympics in Sochi, Russia, from 7 to 23 February 2014. Chile's team consisted of six athletes in three sports, doubling the number of athletes from four years ago.

Competitors

Alpine skiing 

According to the final quota allocation released on 20 January 2014, Chile had three athletes in qualification position. The team consisted of:

Cross-country skiing 

According to the final quota allocation released on 20 January 2014, Chile had one athlete in qualification position. This marked the first time Chile competed in the sport at the Winter Olympics.

Sprint

Freestyle skiing 

According to the final quota allocation released on 20 January 2014, Chile had one athlete in qualification position. Chile has also received a reallocation quota in women's ski cross. Dominique Ohaco finished the women's slopestyle competition in 13th, one position out of qualifying for the final. This marked the first time Chile competed in the sport at the Winter Olympics.

Ski cross

Slopestyle

See also
Chile at the 2014 Summer Youth Olympics 
Chile at the 2014 Winter Paralympics

References

External links 
 
 

Nations at the 2014 Winter Olympics
2014
2014 in Chilean sport